The Hai-Fu Power Plant is a  combined cycle power station located in Luzhu District, Taoyuan City, Taiwan. The power station runs on natural gas and consists of two KA24-2 turbines. The turnkey project was awarded in 1996 to ABB. The customer is EverPower IPP Co. Ltd. with its head office in Taichung.

See also 

 List of largest power stations in the world
 List of natural gas power stations
 Electricity sector in Taiwan

References 

1999 establishments in Taiwan
Buildings and structures in Taoyuan City
Natural gas-fired power stations in Taiwan